Édmond Dharancy (7 October 1887 – 14 July 1961) was a French gymnast. He competed in the men's team event at the 1908 Summer Olympics.

References

External links
 

1887 births
1961 deaths
French male artistic gymnasts
Olympic gymnasts of France
Gymnasts at the 1908 Summer Olympics
Place of birth missing
20th-century French people